Thomas Keightley (17 October 1789 – 4 November 1872) was an Irish writer known for his works on mythology and folklore, particularly Fairy Mythology (1828), later reprinted as The World Guide to Gnomes, Fairies, Elves, and Other Little People (1978, 2000, etc.).

Keightley was as an important pioneer in the study of folklore by modern scholars in the field. He was a "comparativist" folklore collector, drawing parallels between tales and traditions across cultures. A circumspect scholar, he did not automatically assume similar tales indicated transmission, allowing for the possibility that similar tales arose independently.

At the request of the educator Thomas Arnold, he authored a series of textbooks on English, Greek, and other histories, which were adopted at Arnold's Rugby School as well as other public schools.

Life and travels
Keightley, born in October 1789, was the son of Thomas Keightley of Newtown, County Kildare, and claimed to be related to Thomas Keightley (1650?–1719). He entered Trinity College, Dublin, on 4 July 1803, but left without a degree, and due to poor health he was forced to abandon the pursuit of the legal profession and admission to the Irish Bar.

In 1824 he settled in London, and engaged in literary and journalistic work. Keightley is known to have contributed tales to Thomas Crofton Croker's Fairy Legends of South Ireland (1825), though not properly acknowledged. It turned out that he submitted at least one tale ("The Soul Cages") almost entirely of his own fabrication unbeknown to Croker and others.

Having spent time in Italy, he was capable of producing translations of tales from Pentamerone or The Nights of Straparola in Fairy Mythology, and he struck up a friendship with the patriarch of the Rossetti household.

Folklore and mythology 

Keithley was one of "early and important comparativist collectors" of folklore, and "For and early book of folklore The Fairy Mythology sets high standards".

Fairy Mythology
In 1828 Keightley published Fairy Mythology, 2 vols., illustrated by W. H. Brooke. A German translation by  Mythologie der feen und elfen (1828) quickly appeared. Jacob Grimm is said to have praised the work. It was popular among Victorian folklore researchers and literary figures in its day; an expanded edition appeared in 1850, and a newly prefaced one in 1860. It has subsequently been reissued intermittently up to modern times, vindicating Keightley's own "high hopes of immortality for his work" in his preface, despite an early biographer calling this "pretentious".

Keightley is regarded as an early practitioner in England of the Brothers Grimm's approach to the study of myth and folklore, exploring the parallels between the myth of a nation to the religions and mythology of other regions. Thus Keightley began by attempting to trace fairy myth to Gothic and Teutonic roots, as the Grimms had done for elves. Keightley, like the Grimms, eventually reached the conclusion that it was implausible to trace a myth to an ultimate single source, and that parallel myths can be explained by the "Enlightenment idea that human nature [that] is uniform," and similar experiences and responses are shared across mankind.

Conflict over credit 
Keightley had contributed to T. Crofton Croker's Fairy Legend (1825–1828), and Keightley being stimulated to write his own book was perhaps the most important consequence of Croker's publication. But it was an uneasy situation, as Keightley was clearly peeved at Croker for not properly  acknowledging Keightley's aid, even though in the preface to the 1850 edition, Keightley explains the circumstances more cordially, addresses Croker as "one of my earliest literary friends in London".

A selection in Fairy Mythology was an Irish mermaid story entitled "The Soul Cages," which turned out to be a hoax of sorts. The male merrow story was first printed in Croker's anthology, but Keightley came out with a later edition of the Fairy Mythology he added a footnote to this tale, proclaiming he "must here make an honest confession," and informed the reader that except for the kernel of the story adapted from the German story of "The Peasant and the Waterman", this Irish tale was entirely his invention.

Publication history
The Fairy Mythology underwent several printings (1833, 1850, 1878, etc.) in the 19th century.{{Refn|group="lower-alpha"|It was issued in 1833 with a more long-winded title: The Fairy Mythology: Illustrative of the Romance and Superstition of various Countries.}} The 1878 edition was reprinted a century later retitled as The World Guide to Gnomes, Fairies, Elves and Other Little People (New York: Avenel Books, 1978).

Mythology of Ancient Greece
Keightley's bowdlerized The Mythology of Ancient Greece and Italy for the Use of School (1831) was applauded by Thirlwall for making the subject "fit for ladies." In it, Cronus's use of the adamant sickle (harpē) to emasculate his father has been euphemized as an act of Uranus being "mutilated". It has been noted that Keightley took a more historico-scientific, as opposed to theological approach to Greek mythology.

Tales and Popular Fictions
Keightley's Tales and Popular Fictions; their Resemblances and Transmissions from Country to Country, appeared in 1834. He divided the book into three parts, tales which he believed were transmitted to Europe from the Middle East, tale groups demonstrating striking similarity but which he thought were independently conceived, and those which confounded him.

Historical works
Keightley was long occupied in compiling historical manuals for instructional use and popular enlightenment. His Outlines of History was one of the early volumes of Lardner's Cabinet Cyclopædia (1829). His History of the War of Greek Independence (1830) forms volumes lx. and lxi. of Constable's Miscellany.After the Outlines, Keightley was urged by the educator Thomas Arnold of Rugby School to undertake work on a series of mid-sized histories to be used in schools. History of England (1837–39), 2 vols., although based on John Lingard, was intended to counteract that writer's catholic tendencies. Other textbooks followed: History of Greece (1835); Rome (1836); Roman Empire (1840); India in (1846–7). His History of Greece was translated into modern Greek. Keightley also compiled as a study tool Questions on Keightley's History of Greece and Rome (1836), and one on English history (1840) consisted of a long list of history quizzes organized by chapter, for young students of his Roman, Greek, and histories.

Keightley stated he sought to create history material for the schoolroom which were an improvement on Oliver Goldsmith's History, thought himself equal to the task, and found his proof when his titles were "adopt(ed).. immediately on their appearance" by "Eton, Harrow, Rugby, Winchester, and most of the other great public schools, besides a number of private ones." In 1850, Keightley wrote immodestly of his historical output as "yet unrivalled, and may long be unsurpassed." Keightley's History of Rome was derivative of the labors of the German classical historian Barthold Georg Niebuhr, and Keightley's patron or mentor Arnold was a subscriber of Niebuhr's approach.

Samuel Warren, in his Legal Studies, 3rd ed. 1854 (i. 235–6, 349), highly praises his historical work.  But he ludicrously overestimated all his performances, and his claim to have written the best history of Rome in any language, or to be the first to justly value Virgil and Sallust, could not be admitted by his friends. During the last years of his life he received a pension from the civil list. He died at Erith, Kent, on Nov 4, 1872.

Besides the works already mentioned Keightley was author of The Crusaders, or Scenes, Events, and Characters from the times of the Crusaders (1834). His Secret Societies of the Middle Ages (Library of Entertaining Knowledge 1837) was initially published anonymously, and against his wish, and later reprinted in 1848.

Literary criticisms
Keightley edited Virgil's Bucolics and Georgics (1847), which was prefigured by his Notes on the Bucolics and Georgics of Virgil with Excursus, terms of Husbandry, and a Flora Virgiliana, (1846).  Other Latin classics he edited were Horace, Satires and Epistles (1848), Ovid, Fasti (1848), and Sallust, Catilina and Jugurtha (1849).

Milton studies
Keightley produced an annotated edition of Milton (2 vols. 1859) as well as his critical biography Account of the Life, Opinions, and Writings of John Milton, with an Introduction to Paradise Lost (1855). His nuggets of insight have been occasionally invoked, compared, and contradicted in studies into the 20th century and beyond. He is listed among the "distinguished file" in one  survey of past commentaries on Milton, going back three centuries.

Appreciation of allusions in Milton's poems require familiarity with classical Greco-Roman mythology and epics; to borrow the words of an American contemporary Thomas Bulfinch: "Milton abounds in .. allusions" to classical mythology, and especially "scattered profusely" throughout Milton's Paradise Lost. Keightley was one annotator who meticulously tracked Milton's mythological sources. Some of Keightley's flawed commentary have been pointed out.  He argued that Milton erred when he spoke of "Titan, Heaven's first-born," there being no single divine being named Titan, only a race of titans. Though that may be so according to the genealogy laid out by Hesiod's Theogony, it has been pointed out that Milton could well have used alternate sources, such as Lactantius's Divinae Institutiones ("Divine Institutes"), which quotes Ennius to the effect that Uranus had two sons, Titan and Saturn.

Likewise regarding Milton's angelology, Keightley had made some correct observations, but he had constrained the source mostly to the Bible, and made mistakes, such as to identify the angel Ithuriel as a coinage.

Other commentary
Keightley also published an unannotated edition of Shakespeare (6 vols. 1864), followed by a study guide entitled Shakespeare Expositor: an aid to the perfect understanding of Shakespeare's plays (1867).

Keightley is credited with first noticing that Chaucer's Squire's Tale is paralleled by, and hence may have drawn from, the Old French romance, Adenes Le Roi's Cléomadès.

He also wrote of Henry Fielding's peculiarism of using the antiquated "hath" and "doth" ( Fraser's Magazine, 1858), without acknowledging a commentator who made the same observation before him.

Friends and family
Keightley, a friend to Gabriele Rossetti, and firm supporter of the latter's views on Dante became one of a handful of non-Italians who socialized with the family in the childhood days of Dante Gabriel Rossetti and his siblings. Keightley's Fairy Mythology was one of the books Dante Gabriel pored over until age ten.

William Michael Rossetti's Memoir notes that Keightley had as "his nephew and adopted son, Mr. Alfred Chaworth Lyster" who became a dear friend. A pen and ink likeness of this nephew by Dante Gabriel Rossetti exists, dated 1855.The Rossetti Archive: Alfred Chaworth Lyster Writings from the Rossetti family provide some other loose information on Keightley's related kin or on his later private life.  A record by William Rossetti of a spiritual séance at Keightley's home at Belvedere on 4 January 1866, amusing in its own right, identifies "two Misses Keightley" in attendance, a kinsman named "William Samuel Keightley" who died in 1856 supposed to have made his spiritual presence in the session. It has also been remarked that by this period, Keightley had become as "stone-deaf" as Seymour Kirkup, a person who was corresponding with Keightley on matters of spiritualism and visions.

Selected publications

 & Vol. 2
 & Vol. 2

 (Reprint of 1878 ed.)

—— (1848).Secret Societies of the Middle Ages: With Illustrations,  New edition, C. Cox.

 —— (1834). The Crusaders, or Scenes, Events, and Characters from the times of the Crusaders. 1834.
 —— (1838). The Mythology of Ancient Greece and Italy.
 —— (1845). The History of Greece.  Whittaker and Company, London.
 —— (1860). The Manse of Mastland.

Explanatory notes

References
Citations

Bibliography

External links

 
 
 The Fairy Mythology by Thomas Keightley, 1870., available online by Sacred Texts
 

1789 births
1872 deaths
18th-century Irish people
19th-century Irish people
People from County Kildare
Irish writers
Alumni of Trinity College Dublin
Irish folklorists
19th-century Irish historians
Mythographers